The Hunedoara County Prefecture is a building in Deva, Romania. Built in 1889–1890 in a late eclectic style after the plans of architect Ignác Alpár, it houses both the prefect's office of Hunedoara County and the county council.

History 

Permission for building the county home was granted in July 1885, along with a subsidy of 5000 Hungarian forints. The following spring, the council declared a competition for the completion of the construction plan. Among 14 entries Alpár Ignác was chosen. Construction took place between 1889 and 1890.

The building was considered a prefecture until 1920. Since then it has been used by different state institutions, and during Communist rule was the county seat. For a short time after 1989 it housed the town hall of Deva, and then became the seat of the prefecture of Hunedoara county. Since 2007 it has housed the County Council. A renovation began in 2007.

Description 

The building is V-shaped and located in front of the fortress of Deva and the city park. The building is symmetric. At one point servants' quarters and official offices were housed on the first floor.

Upstairs a metersmeeting room is decorated in Neo-Renaissance and Baroque style. The nine-meter-high room is covered with a coffered ceiling and a wrought iron chandelier. The room is full of Neorenaissance decorations. The gallery and the door frames are decorated with the Hunyadi crest, featuring a raven. From the balcony a view of the fortress and the square can be seen. On the balcony are some empty statue recesses.

The roof is covered with green Zsolnay tiles. A high tower in the middle is notable. An indoor garden is behind the building.

References 

 Téglás Gábor: Hunyadvármegyei kalauz – Cluj 1902
 Hunyad weekly- pages appeared between  1887 – 1889
 Gáspár-Barra Réka: Szombathelyen restaurálják a monumentális festményt - Nyugati Jelen daily 15 June 2009.
 Almanac of the History and Archeology Association of Hunyad County 1893-1896

Historic monuments in Hunedoara County
Government buildings completed in 1890
Deva, Romania
Prefecture buildings in Romania